Scopula corrupta is a moth of the family Geometridae. It was described by Prout in 1931. It is found in western Sumatra.

References

Moths described in 1931
corrupta
Taxa named by Louis Beethoven Prout
Moths of Indonesia